Jan Hartl (born 12 September 1952) is a Czech actor who played Karel Horák in the 2000 Czech film Little Otik, also known as Otesánek. He was born in Prague, Czech Republic (then part of Czechoslovakia). Hartl is a member of the National Theatre in Prague.

Selected filmography
 Day for My Love (1976)
 Kopretiny pro zámeckou paní (1981)
 Tajemství hradu v Karpatech (1981)
 Anděl s ďáblem v těle (1983)
 My Sweet Little Village (1985)
 The Post Office Girl (1988, TV film)
 Golet v údolí (1995)
 Little Otik (2000)
 An Earthly Paradise for the Eyes (2009)
 The Don Juans (2013)

References

External links

Taťjana Medvecká a Jan Hartl zvítězili v anketě Neviditelný herec (Divadelní ústav) 

1952 births
Living people
Czech male film actors
Male actors from Prague
21st-century Czech male actors
20th-century Czech male actors
Czech male stage actors
Czech male television actors
Academy of Performing Arts in Prague alumni
Czech voice actors